Dress Rehearsal is the second studio album by Canadian country music singer-songwriter Carolyn Dawn Johnson, and was released on May 4, 2004, on Arista Nashville. It produced the singles "Simple Life" and "Die of a Broken Heart" in the U.S., which respectively reached No. 13 and No. 52 on the Hot Country Songs charts. "Die of a Broken Heart" was a No. 4 hit on the Canadian country charts, while the other two singles — "Head over High Heels" and the title track – respectively charted at No. 5 and No. 11 in Canada. "Squeezin' the Love Outta You" was previously recorded by Redmon & Vale, who released it as a single in 2000.

Track listing

Personnel
Tim Akers – keyboards
Bruce Bouton – steel guitar
Matt Chamberlain – drums
J. T. Corenflos – electric guitar
Eric Darken – percussion
Paul Franklin – steel guitar, Dobro
Amy Grant – background vocals
Jim Hoke – accordion, harmonica, Jew's harp
Wes Hightower – background vocals
Dann Huff – acoustic guitar, electric guitar, Dobro
Carolyn Dawn Johnson – lead vocals, background vocals, acoustic guitar
Gordon Kennedy – acoustic guitar, electric guitar, sitar, background vocals
Steve Mandile – background vocals
Greg Morrow – drums
Steve Nathan – keyboards
John "J.R" Robinson – drums, percussion
Keith Urban – acoustic guitar, electric guitar, soloist, background vocals
John Willis – acoustic guitar
Glenn Worf – bass guitar
Jonathan Yudkin – mandolin, fiddle, violin, viola, cello

Chart performance

References

2004 albums
Arista Records albums
Carolyn Dawn Johnson albums
Albums produced by Dann Huff
Canadian Country Music Association Album of the Year albums